The 2004 South Australian National Football League (SANFL) Grand Final saw the Central District Bulldogs defeat Woodville-West Torrens by 125 points to claim the club's fourth premiership victory.

The match was played on Sunday 3 October 2004 at Football Park in front of a crowd of 24,207.

References 

SANFL Grand Finals
Sanfl Grand Final, 2004